The Nokia 5530 XpressMusic is a smartphone by Nokia announced on 15 June 2009. Part of the XpressMusic series of phones, it emphasizes music and multimedia playback. It is Nokia's third touchscreen phone (after the 5800 and N97) based on the Symbian OS (S60) 5th edition platform.

In terms of specifications, it rests between the lower Nokia 5230 and the higher 5800. Bearing a much lower price tag, it lacks the 5800's 3G capability and GPS receiver, but has a more compact and sleek design than both models, as well as stereo speakers.

See also
Nokia X6
Nokia 5530 series

References

External links
Stress testing a Nokia 5530

Nokia smartphones
Portable media players
Handwriting recognition
S60 (software platform)
Devices capable of speech recognition
Mobile phones introduced in 2009